Lars Tomanek (born 2 November 1965) is a German former water polo player. He competed in the men's tournament at the 1996 Summer Olympics.

References

External links
 

1965 births
Living people
German male water polo players
Olympic water polo players of Germany
Water polo players at the 1996 Summer Olympics
People from Peine (district)
Sportspeople from Lower Saxony